Let It Be Me is a 1936 Warner Bros. Merrie Melodies cartoon directed by Friz Freleng. The short was released on May 2, 1936.

Plot
The plot revolves around an anthropomorphic hen named Emily (a prototype Miss Prissy), whose boyfriend rooster, Clem, is just about to propose marriage to her when she gets infatuated with a passing rooster motorist, the radio crooner Mr. Bingo (a caricature of Bing Crosby).  She goes with Mr. Bingo instead. Bingo, while dating Emily in a nightclub, gets infatuated with a singing French hen (a caricature of Irene Bordoni), and after Emily cries that Bingo no longer loves her, has a waiter throw her out into the street. Crying, she then fends for herself selling violets on a winter day. The jilted Clem, meanwhile, overhears Mr. Bingo on the radio. Clem soon goes from jilted to livid when he grabs the radio and smashes it on the ground, with the "boo boo boo boo" sounding as if the radio is in its death throes, then eventually makes his way to the city, goes to the radio station and gives Bingo his just due in the middle of a broadcast. Clem then finds Emily selling violets, forgives her and marries her, and sires her brood.

In the concluding scene, both Clem and Emily are lounging in the living room when the scene is cut to one of her brood of chicks singing at the piano the song that Emily first heard when she dated Mr. Bingo. A book is hurled and hits the poor chick, silencing the singing.

Legal cases
This cartoon, along with Bingo Crosbyana were the two Warner Bros. cartoons which Bing Crosby initiated lawsuits to suppress because they portrayed him in what Crosby considered a defamatory light. In this case, he objected to his portrayal as unfaithful to women and to the imitation of his voice.

Home media
LaserDisc - The Golden Age of Looney Tunes, Volume 4, Side 5
DVD - Follow the Fleet

References

External links

1936 films
1936 animated films
1936 comedy films
Films scored by Bernard B. Brown
Films scored by Norman Spencer (composer)
Short films directed by Friz Freleng
Merrie Melodies short films
Warner Bros. Cartoons animated short films
Animated films about chickens
Cultural depictions of Bing Crosby
1930s Warner Bros. animated short films
1930s English-language films